Shawn Russell (born 15 June 1987) is a 4.0 point wheelchair basketball player from Australia. In 2016, he was selected as part of the Rollers for the 2016 Summer Paralympics in Rio de Janeiro.

Biography 
Shawn Russell was born on 15 June 1987, with one leg shorter than the other. When he was 16, it was amputated.   He was visited by Eino Okkonen, an amputee himself, and the founder of the Wollongong Roller Hawks, a team in the National Wheelchair Basketball League (NWBL). Okkonen tried to persuade Russell to take up wheelchair basketball, but  Russell saw himself as a swimmer, and initially declined the offer. Undaunted, Okkonen convinced Russell to attend a Roller Hawks training session, and Russell joined the team in 2004. It went on to win back-to-back titles in 2011 and 2012.

Russell made his international debut with the U23 team (the Spinners) at the FisBIT Games in Kuala Lumpur in 2007, and in 2009 he was part of the team at the IWBF U23 World Wheelchair Basketball Championship in Paris. Later that year he made his debut with the  senior national team (the Rollers) at the Asia-Oceania Zone Championship, won by the Rollers. He played overseas in Spain in 2010 and 2011. Moving to Victoria, he joined the Kilsyth Cobras, who win the league title in 2015 and 2016. In June 2016, he toured Great Britain for the 2016 Continental Clash against Canada, Great Britain, Japan, the Netherlands and the United States. The Rollers were defeated by the United States, and won silver. In July 2016, he was selected for the 2016 Summer Paralympics in Rio de Janeiro. He was one of five Rollers selected for their first Paralympics  where they finished sixth.

References

External links

Basketball Australia Profile

1987 births
Living people
Paralympic wheelchair basketball players of Australia
Wheelchair basketball players at the 2016 Summer Paralympics